Simona Krstanovska (born 10 August 1997) is a Macedonian footballer who plays as a midfielder for Montenegrin 1. ŽFL club ŽFK Breznica and the North Macedonia women's national team.

International goals
Scores and results list Macedonia's goal tally first

References

1997 births
Living people
Women's association football midfielders
Macedonian women's footballers
North Macedonia women's international footballers
ŽFK Spartak Subotica players
Macedonian expatriate footballers
Macedonian expatriate sportspeople in Serbia
Expatriate women's footballers in Serbia
Macedonian expatriate sportspeople in Slovenia
Expatriate women's footballers in Slovenia
Macedonian expatriate sportspeople in Montenegro
Expatriate  footballers in Montenegro
ŽNK Olimpija Ljubljana players
ŽFK Breznica players